Gilbert Jones  was an English lawyer and politician who sat in the House of Commons  in 1640.

Jones was probably the son of Gilbert Jones of Poole, Montgomery and was a student of Gray's Inn in 1617. He attended All Souls' College, Oxford and was awarded BCL on 10 March 1623  and DCL on 14 January 1628. He lived at Dorchester.

In April 1640, Jones was elected Member of Parliament for Wareham in the Short Parliament. Jones was chancellor of the diocese of Bristol by 1661.

References

Year of birth missing
Year of death missing
English MPs 1640 (April)
English lawyers
Alumni of All Souls College, Oxford